Coro Allegro is a classical music choral group based in Boston, Massachusetts, drawing its members from the LGBT community. It was founded in 1990.

Profile and performances

Coro Allegro was founded specifically to be a chorus of both gay men and lesbians who share a passion for music, and it remains the only organization in Boston committed to bringing exciting classical repertoire to the LGBTQ+ community. The chorus also succeeds in bringing classical music to a wider audience. In its first twenty years, its numbers grew from just twenty singers to more than sixty.

The chorus regularly collaborates with other musical ensembles. Among its most notable collaborations have been performances of Mendelssohn’s Elijah in 1999 with the Boston Cecilia and the Handel and Haydn Society under the direction of Christopher Hogwood; of Robert Kapilow’s baseball cantata, a setting of Casey at the Bat for chorus, in 2001 with Musica Viva in collaboration choreographer Daniel Pelzig; of Brahms’ German Requiem in 2003 with Boston Cecilia under the baton of Donald Teeters; and of both Poulenc's Gloria and Bernstein's Chichester Psalms in 2004 with Boston Cecilia.

Coro Allegro participates in the quadrennial GALA Choruses Festival. It has also traveled to participate in the following music festivals:
Tampa, Florida, 1996
San Jose, California, 2000
Place des Arts, Montreal, Quebec, 2004
Adrienne Arsht Center for the Performing Arts, Miami, Florida, 2008
Denver Performing Arts Complex, Denver, Colorado, 2012

Premieres and commissions
During its history Coro Allegro has presented 23 world premieres, including 14 works commissioned by or for Coro Allegro, plus three American premieres and five Boston premieres.
Kenneth Fuchs' Three Songs on Robert Frost Texts, 1994
Kenneth Fuchs' In the Clearing, 1995
Daniel Pinkham's The White Raven, 1996			
Ruth Lomon's Requiem for soprano and chorus accompanied by brass and woodwinds, 1997
Patricia Van Ness's The Voice of the Tenth Muse, 1998
Charles Fussell’s Infinite Fraternity, May 16, 2003 at Sanders Theatre
David Brunner's The Wheel, 2004
Patricia Van Ness's Requiem for baritone, chorus, two violins, viola, cello, bass and oboe, October 31, 2004
Robert Stern’s “Shofar,” November 5, 2006 at Sanders Theatre
Fred Onovwerosuoke's “A Triptych of American Voices: A Cantata of the People,” Sunday, March 24, 2019 at Sanders Theatre

Pinkham Award

Since 2008, Coro Allegro has chosen the recipient of the Daniel Pinkham Award, given annually in memory of the acclaimed and beloved Boston composer and conductor. Daniel Pinkham. The award is given annually in recognition of outstanding contributions to classical music and to the LGBTQ+ community. Award recipients are:

Sanford Sylvan, 2008
Bishop Gene Robinson, 2009
Fenwick Smith, 2010
Patricia Van Ness, 2011
Donald Teeters, 2012
David Hodgkins, 2013
Laury Gutierrez, 2014
Lorna Cooke Devaron, 2015
Janson Wu, 2016
Catherine Peterson, 2017
Robin Godfrey, 2018
Darryl Hollister, 2019

Collaborations
The chorus regularly collaborates with other musical ensembles. Among its most notable collaborations have been performances of Mendelssohn’s Elijah in 1999 with the Boston Cecilia and the Handel and Haydn Society under the direction of Christopher Hogwood; of Robert Kapilow’s baseball cantata, a setting of Casey at the Bat for chorus, in 2001 with Boston Musica Viva in collaboration with choreographer Daniel Pelzig for the Celebrity Series of Boston; of Brahms’ German Requiem in 2003 with Boston Cecilia under the baton of Donald Teeters; of both Poulenc's Gloria and Bernstein's Chichester Psalms in 2004 with Boston Cecilia, the premiere of Leaving Limerick in the Rain by Pablo Ortiz with the Terezin Music Foundation at Liberation: A Concert Honoring the 70th Anniversary of the Liberation of the Nazi Camps
in Boston Symphony Hall, two performances with The Heritage Chorale of New Haven of William Grant Still's And They Lynched Him on a Tree, the last in 2019, and performances in Boston Common and at the Hatch Shell at the Esplanade with the Boston Landmarks Orchestra. Coro Allegro has also collaborated the Back Bay Ringers, the Boston City Singers, the Boston Gay Men’s Chorus, Chorus Pro Musica, City on a Hill Charter School Chorus, La Donna Musicale, Pro Arte Chamber Orchestra, Rumbarroco, Toronto Children’s Chorus, and the United Parish Chancel Choir.

GALA Choruses festivals
Coro Allegro participates in the quadrennial GALA Choruses festival. 
Tampa, Florida, 1996
San Jose, California, 2000
Place des Arts, Montreal, Quebec, 2004
Adrienne Arsht Center for the Performing Arts, Miami, Florida, 2008
Denver Performing Arts Complex, Denver, Colorado, 2012
Denver Performing Arts Complex, Denver, Colorado, 2016

References

External links

Official website

American choirs
GALA choruses
LGBT-themed musical groups
Musical groups established in 1990
Musical groups from Boston